You Love Me is a 1999 EP by the Meat Puppets. This was the first release from the then new line-up of the Meat Puppets. It was available free only through the official Meat Puppets website to promote the band's new line-up. The EP became a sought-after collectable.

"Armed and Stupid" and the title track were re-released on the 2000 album Golden Lies.

Critical reception
Trouser Press wrote: "The self-production, nearly identical to [Paul] Leary’s, partially buries the careening lead guitar fills, leaving the rhythm section as the base. Vocals on 'Been Caught Itchin" and 'Monkey Dance' are reminiscent of early releases, while the latter borrows a rhythm figure from Nirvana’s 'Stain.' The excellent ballad 'Diaper' is otherwise unavailable."

Track listing
All songs written by Curt Kirkwood, unless otherwise noted.
   
 "You Love Me" - 3:56
 "Vegetable’s Opinion" - 4:45
 "Armed & Stupid" - 3:23
 "Monkey Dance" - 3:34
 "Been Caught Itchin’" - 3:31
 "God’s Holy Angels" - 6:26
 "Diaper" - 5:04

Personnel
Andrew Duplantis - bass
Curt Kirkwood - guitar, vocals
Kyle Ellison - guitar
Shandon Sahm - drums

References

Meat Puppets albums
1999 EPs
London Records EPs